Ebenezer Presbyterian Church may refer to:

 Ebenezer Presbyterian Church (Keene, Kentucky), listed on the NRHP in Kentucky
 Ebenezer Academy, Bethany Presbyterian Church and Cemetery, Houstonville, NC, listed on the NRHP in North Carolina
 Ebenezer Presbyterian Church (New Bern, North Carolina), listed on the NRHP in North Carolina
 Ebenezer Associate Reformed Presbyterian Church, Jenkinsville, SC, listed on the NRHP in South Carolina
Ebenezer Presbyterian Church, Osu, Accra, Ghana
 Ramseyer Memorial Presbyterian Church, Ghana